Dance nation may refer to:
Dance Nation (dance group), a Dutch dance group
Dance Nation (play), by Clare Barron
Dance Nation (record label), a British independent record label, a subsidiary of Ministry of Sound
Dance Nation (TV channel), a music TV Channel, since rebranded to Chart Show Dance